Elías Miguel Moreno Brizuela (born 23 September 1957) is a Mexican cardiologist and politician affiliated with the Party of the Democratic Revolution. As of 2014 he served as Senator of the LVIII and LIX Legislatures of the Mexican Congress representing Veracruz and as Deputy of the LVI Legislature.

References

1957 births
Living people
Politicians from Veracruz
Members of the Senate of the Republic (Mexico)
Members of the Chamber of Deputies (Mexico)
Party of the Democratic Revolution politicians
20th-century Mexican politicians
21st-century Mexican politicians
Universidad Veracruzana alumni